The discography of American indie folk band Bon Iver consists of four studio albums, two extended plays (EP), eight singles and four music videos. The material has been released by the Jagjaguwar label in North America and by the 4AD label in Europe.

Founded by singer-songwriter Justin Vernon, Bon Iver released its debut album, For Emma, Forever Ago in 2008. An EP, Blood Bank, followed in 2009. The title track peaked at number 37 on the UK Singles Chart and also reached the charts in Ireland and France. The group's second full-length studio album, Bon Iver, was released in 2011. It debuted at number two on the US Billboard 200 chart, number four on the UK Albums Chart and peaked inside the top 10 in Canada, Denmark, Ireland and the Netherlands.

Studio albums

Extended plays

Singles

As lead artist

As featured artist

Other charted and certified songs

Guest appearances

Selected compilations, soundtracks and guest appearances
 "Brackett, WI" released on Dark Was the Night (February 17, 2009 – 3 x LP & 2 x CD).
 "For Emma" (live) released on Live at the World Cafe Vol. 27 (2009 – U.S. CD)
 "Skinny Love" (live) released on "Later... Live2 with Jools Holland" (October 12, 2009 – 2 x CD)
 "Rosyln" (with St. Vincent) released on The Twilight Saga: New Moon: Original Motion Picture Soundtrack (October 19, 2009 – CD.  December 2009 – 2 x LP)
 "Flume", "Wisconsin" and "Soft Light" featured on the feature film The Builder by R. Alverson (July 27, 2010 – DVD)
 My Beautiful Dark Twisted Fantasy by Kanye West (November 22, 2010 – CD); featuring Bon Iver on six total tracks including "Monster" and "Lost in the World". Writing credits for Justin Vernon and featuring Bon Iver on "Monster" and "Lost in The World".
"The Wolves (Act I & II)" featured on the feature film Rust and Bone (October 29, 2012 – Film)
"The Wolves (Act I & II)" featured on the feature film The Place Beyond the Pines (March 29, 2013 – Film)
 "Come Talk To Me" featured on And I'll Scratch Yours by Peter Gabriel (September 24, 2013)
"Heavenly Father" released on the Wish I Was Here soundtrack (June 20, 2014 – CD/Digital)
"re: stacks" featured in the feature film As Cool As I Am.
 "I Need a Forest Fire" features Bon Iver on James Blake's third studio album The Colour in Anything.

Promotional videos
 "The Wolves (Acts I & II)" (2008 – directed by Matt Amato, filmed in Fall Creek, Wisconsin, January 2008)
 "Take Away Show" – (2008 – Limited 3-track DVD in hand stamped card sleeve, free with copies of  For Emma, Forever Ago purchased from Rough Trade Records, November/December 2008)
 "Calgary" (2011 – Directed by Andre Durand and Dan Huiting)
 "Holocene" (2011 – Directed by Nabil Elderkin, filmed in Iceland)
 "Towers" (2012 – Directed by Nabil Elderkin, filmed in Washington state)
 "Bon Iver: Autumn" (2019 – Directed by Andrew Swant, filmed in Milwaukee, Wisconsin)

Related releases
 Night of the Furies Remixed – The Rosebuds (April 2008 – download); featuring Justin Vernon remix of "Get Up, Get Out".
 Unmap – Volcano Choir (September 22, 2009 – CD, LP & download); featuring Justin Vernon.
 A Decade With Duke – Eau Claire Memorial High Jazz 1 featuring Justin Vernon (December 7, 2009 – U.S.-only 14-track CD & iTunes 8-track download).
 Hadestown – Anaïs Mitchell (April 9, 2010 – CD); featuring Justin Vernon.
 Relayted by Gayngs (May 2010 – CD, LP); featuring Justin Vernon and Mike Noyce.
 "Broken Hearts & Dirty Windows: Songs of John Prine" – by various artists (June 22, 2010 – CD); featuring Justin Vernon.
 High Violet by The National (May 11, 2010 – CD, LP download); featuring Justin Vernon.
 All We Grow – S. Carey debut album (August 24, 2010 – CD, LP and download); Sean Carey solo album.
 "Harbors" – All Tiny Creatures (2011); featuring Justin Vernon.
 "Grown Unknown" – Lia Ices (January 25, 2011); song "Daphne" featuring Justin Vernon.
 Watch the Throne by Jay-Z & Kanye West (August 12, 2011 – download); writing credits for Justin Vernon on "That's My Bitch", backing vocals on various tracks.
 If I Was by The Staves (March 2015 – CD, LP); produced by Justin Vernon & features CJ Camerieri, Matt McCaughan, Rob Moose, Justin Vernon.

Notes

References

External links
 

Discographies of American artists
Folk music discographies